Daxin County is a county in the west of Guangxi Zhuang Autonomous Region, China. It is under the administration of Chongzuo city.

The southwest border of Daxin County is along Cao Bằng Province, Vietnam. The legal description is mainly determined for a part of its length by the midline of the watercourse along the Guichun River and its Detian Falls.

Climate

See also
 Ban Gioc – Detian Falls
 Daxin: Stealthy Backdoor Designed for Attacks Against Hardened Networks

References

 
Counties of Guangxi
Chongzuo